Abu Oqab (also Romanized as Abū ‘Oqāb; also known as Bāgābb) is a village in Minubar Rural District, Arvandkenar District, Abadan County, Khuzestan Province, Iran. At the 2006 census, its population was 704, in 160 families.

References 

Populated places in Abadan County